The 2014–15 Biathlon World Cup – Sprint Men started on Saturday December 6, 2014 in Östersund and finished on Thursday March 19, 2015 in Khanty-Mansiysk. Martin Fourcade of France successfully defended his title.

Competition format
The  sprint race is the third oldest biathlon event; the distance is skied over three laps. The biathlete shoots two times at any shooting lane, first prone, then standing, totalling 10 targets. For each missed target the biathlete has to complete a penalty lap of around 150 metres. Competitors' starts are staggered, normally by 30 seconds.

2013–14 Top 3 Standings

Medal winners

Standings

References

Sprint Men